Nonpartisan elections are currently held every four years to elect the mayor of Green Bay, Wisconsin.

Elections before 1995

1995
The 1995 Green Bay mayoral election was held to elect the mayor of Green Bay, Wisconsin. It saw the election of Paul Jadin.

Entering the race as a political unknown, Jadin advanced to the general election from an eight-candidate nonpartisan primary. In the general election, Jadin won 55% of the vote.

1999
The 1999 Green Bay mayoral election was held to elect the mayor of Green Bay, Wisconsin. It saw the reelection of Paul Jadin.

Jadin became the first mayor in over a half-century to win an election unopposed.

2003

The 2003 Green Bay mayoral election was held February 18 and April 1, 2003 to elect the mayor of Green Bay, Wisconsin. It saw the election of Jim Schmitt.

Results

2007

The 2007 Green Bay mayoral election was held April 3, 2007 to elect the mayor of Green Bay, Wisconsin. It saw the reelection of incumbent mayor Jim Schmitt.

Results

2011

The 2011 Green Bay mayoral election was held February 15 and April 5, 2011 to elect the mayor of Green Bay, Wisconsin. It saw the reelection of incumbent mayor Jim Schmitt.

Results

2015

The 2015 Green Bay mayoral election was held February 17 and April 7, 2015 to elect the mayor of Green Bay, Wisconsin. It saw the reelection of incumbent mayor Jim Schmitt.

Results

2019

The 2019 Green Bay mayoral election was held on April 2, 2019 to elect the mayor of Green Bay, Wisconsin. It saw the election of Eric Genrich. The primary election was held on April 17.

Incumbent mayor, Jim Schmitt, did not seek reelection.

While the election was officially nonpartisan, the two candidates who advanced to the general election were both backed by a major political party, Genrich by the Democratic Party and Buckley by the Republican Party.

Polls
General election

Results

2023

The 2023 Green Bay mayoral election will be held on April 4, 2023 to elect the mayor of Green Bay, Wisconsin. It was preceded by a primary election held on February 21. Incumbent mayor Eric Genrich is running for re-election to a second term in office. Genrich and challenger Chad Weininger advanced to the general election.

Candidates

Declared
Paul Boucher, perennial candidate
Eric Genrich, incumbent mayor (Party affiliation: Democratic)
Jane Juza, laundromat owner and real estate agent
Chad Weininger, Brown County Director of Administration, former Green Bay City Clerk, and former state assemblyman (Party affiliation: Republican)

Declined
Jim Schmitt, former mayor (Party affiliation: Republican)

Primary election

General election

References